Mi'ilya is an Arab local council in the western Galilee in the Northern District of Israel. Its name during the Kingdom of Jerusalem era in Galilee was Castellum Regis. The town is located immediately to the northwest of Ma'alot-Tarshiha.

History
Archaeological excavations in Mi'ilya gives indication of inhabitation from the Late Bronze Age and Iron Age, as well as Hellenistic, Roman, Byzantine, Crusader, Mamluk and Ottoman periods.

Crusader period
In the Crusader period, Mi'ilya was first mentioned in 1160, when it and several surrounding villages was transferred to a Crusader named Iohanni de Caypha (Johannes of Haifa).

In 1179 Viscountess Petronella of Acre sold the houses, vineyards and gardens of Mi'ilya to Count Jocelyn III, uncle of Baldwin IV, and in 1183, Baldwin IV transferred a house that he had bought in Mi'ilya from the scribe, John of Bogalet, in addition to other possessions in the vicinity of Mi'ilya to the same uncle, Jocelyn III.

However, in 1187 Mi'ilya (including its castle) fell to Saladin. In 1188 it was granted by Conrad of Montferrat to the Pisans who were defending Acre, but it is unclear if they ever took control of it.

In 1220 Jocelyn III's daughter Beatrix de Courtenay and her husband Otto von Botenlauben, Count of Henneberg, sold Mi'ilya to the Teutonic Knights on 31 May, for the sum of 7000 marks of silver. This included Mi'ilya with its dependencies, and a third of the fief of St. George. In 1228, Jocelyn III's grandson James of Mandale sold his part to the Teutonic Knights.

Between 1220 and 1243, the Teutonic Knights bought a number of properties from private owners around the castle.

Another document from the year 1257 mentions a house and other property in Mi‘ilya that belonged to the Bishop of Akko.

By 1268/71 Mi'ilya was conquered by Baibars.

Ottoman period

In 1596, Mi'ilya appeared in Ottoman tax registers as being in the Nahiya of Akka of the Liwa Safad, with a population of 15 Muslim households and 2 Christian households. The villagers paid a fixed tax-rate of 25% on various agricultural products, including  wheat, barley, olives, and goats or beehives, a total of 2,151 akçe.

In 1838, Ma'lia was noted as a  village in the El Jebel district, located west of  Safad.

In the  1881  PEF's Survey of Western Palestine   Mi'ilya was described as being a large and well-built village of stone, containing 450 Christians, surrounded by olives and arable land.

A population list from about 1887 showed Ma'lia to have about 775 inhabitants, all Christians.

British Mandate period
In the 1922 census of Palestine conducted by the British Mandatory authorities, Mi'ilya had a population of 442 inhabitants; 429 Christians and 13 Muslims. Of the Christians, 3 were Orthodox, 2 Catholics and 424 Greek Catholic (Melchite). The population had increased in the 1931 census to 579; 553 Christians, 25 Muslims and 1 Druse, in a total of 138 houses.

In the 1945 statistics, the population had increased to 900; 790 Christians and 110 Muslims, while the total land area was 29,084 dunams, according to an official land and population survey. Of this, 1,509 dunams were allocated for plantations and irrigable land, 2,883 for cereals, while 123 dunams were classified as built-up areas.

State of Israel
In the early part of 1948 the village suffered from food shortages and harassment from neighbouring Jewish areas. It was captured by the Israel Defense Forces during Operation Hiram at the end of October. After a short fight, most of population fled into the countryside. The following day the local IDF commander allowed them to return to their homes. This was one of the few occasions when villagers were allowed back into their villages after they had left. In January 1949 some villagers from Mi'ilya were expelled to Jenin, they complained of being robbed by Israeli soldiers whilst being deported. The Ministry for Minority Affairs reported that a further 25 villagers were expelled in March being suspected of passing information to the enemy. Mi'ilya was recognized as a local council in 1957. The Arab population remained under martial law until 1966.

Transportation
Mi'ilya is located on Highway 89 which connects Nahariya with Elifelet via Safed.

Landmarks

King's castle

Kings castle, was first noted in Crusader sources in 1160, when it was probably built during King Baldwin III's reign, along with one of the biggest wineries in the Crusader states.

By 1179 the castle had apparently been rebuilt, as it was then called Castellum Novo. In 1182, Baldwin IV granted the castle to his uncle, Jocelyn III. At this time it was called "The new castle in the mountains of Acre".

By 1187, the castle fell to Saladin, but was soon back in Crusader control. In the  1220, ownership passed to the Teutonic Knights. However, the importance of the castle of Mi'ilya was by this time superseded by the Montfort Castle.

The Arab geographer, Al-Dimashqi, noted the "fine castle", and that close to it was a very pleasant valley, where musk-pears and large citrons were grown.

Victor Guérin found in 1875 that  “on the highest part of the hill we remark the remains of an ancient fortress, flanked by four square towers; considerable portions remain, showing that it was built of regular blocks, some levelled plane and some embossed; the latter were reserved for the angles. The ruins and interior of this fortress are now inhabited by about twenty families, which have built their little habitations in the midst of the debris.”

Church of St Mary Magdalen

Victor Guérin visited in 1875, and noted  that "The Greeks had just rebuilt their church on the foundations of another much more ancient, which was decorated with monolithic columns with capitals imitating Corinthian columns.“

See also
 Arab localities in Israel
 Arab Christians
Archaeology of Israel

References

Bibliography

 (P. 634)

External links
Welcome To Mi'ilya
Survey of Western Palestine, Map 3:  IAA, Wikimedia commons
Journal of Palestine Studies. Volume 1 #4. Summer 1972. Shoufani, Elias The fall of a village.

Arab localities in Israel
Arab Christian communities in Israel
Castles of the Teutonic Knights
Local councils in Northern District (Israel)
 Archaeology of Israel